Ceyhan Yazar (born February 1, 1944), is a former Turkish soccer player who played in the NASL.

Career statistics

Club

Notes

References

Living people
Turkish footballers
Turkish expatriate footballers
Association football forwards
Göztepe S.K. footballers
Rochester Lancers (1967–1980) players
New York Cosmos players
North American Soccer League (1968–1984) players
Expatriate soccer players in the United States
Turkish expatriate sportspeople in the United States
1944 births